Laa is a Pakistani drama serial written by playwright and poet Sarmad Sehbai,  directed by Farooq Rind and produced by Momina Duraid. It stars Meekal Zulfiqar, Sadia Khan and Sabreen Hisbani in lead roles. The serial aired Saturday evenings on Hum TV.

Plot
The story revolves around Daniyal Malik, a rich and humble person who has bet his friends that he would make Naina Syed fall in love with him during her stay at Daniyal's house with her family. The story then takes a turn when Daniyal discovers his past. Naimat Khan, informs him that he's adopted. He finds out that with the parent he's living with are not his real parents. He was given to them, because his dad couldn't take care of him because of his step mother. The marriage was kept secret, that's why Daniyal's mother had to sacrifice his son and leave him.

Daniyal goes to search for his birth parents and finally meets a man who is aware of the truth. It is later revealed that Naimat Khan was his dad's servant and wanted to take revenge and that is why he had approached Daniyal. Naimat Khan's daughter was murdered by Daniyal's step mother and Naimat Khan wanted Daniyal to take revenge from his half brother, Dilawar. His step family was very rich but it was Naimat Khan's wish that Daniyal takes over his dad's place as peer and not Dilawar. However, Dilawar gets to know the truth and finds out that Daniyal is his half brother and is about to kill him but a lady instead takes the bullet. That lady is a good friend of Daniyal's real mother, who is also a lawyer. Meanwhile, Daniyal is sent to prison because the police thinks it is him who tried killing the girl. Daniyal's mother takes up his case and helps him in getting out of prison. Naina helps him too. Later, the lady who took the bullet, gains consciousness and declares that Daniyal did not shoot her. She also says that she is Daniyal's mother. She knew the truth, just when Dilawar shot her. However, whilst knowing the truth she gets so shocked and overwhelmed with emotions, because she thought Daniyal was dead. She approaches Daniyal and tells him the truth. Daniyal is happy, but then he decides to live with his foster parents instead of his birth mother since they took care of him and have always been there for him.

Cast
 Mikaal Zulfiqar as Daniyal Malik
 Qavi Khan as Daniyal's father
 Saiqa as Zareena (Daniyal's mother)
 Seemi Raheel as Naina's mother
 Naeem Tahir as Naina's father 
 Khalid Malik as Dilawar Shah  
 Sadia Khan as Naina Syed  
 Rehan Sheikh as Naimat Khan 
 Mehreen as Sohai 
 Rabia Noreen as Sanam
 Sabreen Hisbani
 Laila Zuberi  
 Ali Saqi
 Ashraf Rehman 
 Xile Huma 
 Shamaa Asif
 Almaas Butt

Soundtrack

The theme song of Laa was written by Sarmad Sehbai and composed by Sahir Ali Bagga, while the background score was composed by Waqas Azeem. The song was sung by Javed Bashir.

Track listing

See also

 List of Pakistani television serials

References

External links
 Official website

Urdu-language television shows
Pakistani drama television series
2014 Pakistani television series debuts
Hum TV original programming
2013 Pakistani television series endings